The 2008 World Enduro Championship was the 19th season in the FIM World Enduro Championship. The season consisted of eight events and 16 races.

Last season's Enduro 2 champion, Honda's Mika Ahola, took his second world championship title now racing in the Enduro 1 class. In the Enduro 2 class, Yamaha's Johnny Aubert won his first world championship, becoming the first racer to defeat Juha Salminen since the 1998 season. With nine wins, Salminen broke compatriot Kari Tiainen's record (77) for most wins in the series. In Enduro 3, KTM's Samuli Aro became the sixth enduro rider to win five world championship titles.

Events

Riders' championship - top 10

Enduro 1

Enduro 2

Enduro 3

Manufacturers' championship

External links

Full results at the official website

Motorcycle off-road racing series
World Enduro